Jyoti Mirdha (born 26 July 1972) is an Indian politician. She was elected to the 15th Lok Sabha (2009-2014) from the Nagaur (Lok Sabha constituency) as a Congress party candidate.

Family and early life
Jyoti Mirdha Gehlaut is the daughter of Ram Prakash Mirdha and Veena Mirdha and also the granddaughter of Nathuram Mirdha, a prominent politician.

Political career
Jyoti Mirdha represented the Nagaur parliamentary constituency in the 15th Lok Sabha and is a member of the Indian National Congress (INC). She won the seat by a margin of 1.55-lakh votes in 2009. She has had a meaningful impact on several issues as a member of the Parliamentary Standing Committee on Health and Family Welfare, and has debated on issues concerning generic drugs, bringing more drugs under the price control regime, low expenditure on research and development by pharmaceutical companies, organ donation legislation, and the HPV vaccine.

Mirdha has urged for stricter controls over the retail prices of pharmaceuticals, saying "Ideally, all 900 or so molecules being marketed should be brought under price control, as partial control will not be effective since manufacturers freely migrate from price-controlled drugs to those outside price control."

In 2010, Mirdha also expressed concern that doctors were being bribed by pharmaceutical companies with gifts and travel. She sent evidence to Prime Minister Manmohan Singh claiming that up to 11 doctors and 30 of their family members were being reimbursed by pharmaceutical companies for summer travel to countries like England and Scotland. In her letter, she cited a loophole in a law intended to prevent doctors from accepting favours from pharmaceutical companies, which did not prevent the companies from offering these gifts.

Positions held in parliament
2009 Elected to 15th Lok Sabha
31 August 2009 Member, Committee on Health and Family Welfare till 31 August 2012
23 September 2009 Member, Committee on Empowerment of Women till 31 August 2012
31 August 2012 Member, Committee on Agriculture till 30 April 2014
Ex Member, Institute Body, AIIMS, New Delhi

References 

1972 births
Living people
India MPs 2009–2014
People from Nagaur district
University of Rajasthan alumni
Women in Rajasthan politics
Indian National Congress politicians from Rajasthan
Lok Sabha members from Rajasthan
Jyoti
21st-century Indian women politicians
21st-century Indian politicians